Noricum was an ancient Celtic kingdom, Noricum may also refer to:

Province of Noricum, Imperial Roman Province
Regnum Noricum, Celtic Kingdom
Bythiospeum noricum, snail species
Noricum scandal, an Austrian arms export scandal
Noricum, a part of the surface of the asteroid 21 Lutetia